The Central Coast Mariners FC, also known as the Central Coast Mariners Women, represented the Central Coast Mariners in the Australian Women's National Football League, then known as the W-League for two seasons between 2008 and 2009. In July 2010 it was announced the team would not be compete in the 2010 W-League, due to a lack of funding.

The club announced an intention to return to the A-League Women competition for the 2022–23 season, which was subsequently postponed to 2023–24.

History

2008–09 season

As one of the 7 established Australian A-League clubs, the Central Coast Mariners Women was announced to coincide with the establishment of the new W-League. In early September, Stephen Roche was appointed as the inaugural team coach. In October 2008, the squad was announced and featured Matildas Kyah Simon, Lyndsay Glohe and Renee Rollason. As the club was funded by Football NSW and not the Mariners exclusively, the W-League outfit played home matches in Sydney's west at Parramatta Stadium and Campbelltown Stadium, which was an opportunity for the Mariners brand to spread into areas outside the Central Coast.

Although the Mariners season got off to a bad start with a loss to the Melbourne Victory, they soon found their feet to record back-to-back wins over Perth Glory and Canberra United, however, against Canberra, lost their first choice keeper Lisa Hartley after she fouled a Canberra United attacker and was shown a straight red card. The following three fixtures were all lost by the Mariners and failed to gain a point, including two back-to-back fixtures where the Mainers failed to score a goal. Those three fixtures were also at the Mariners' second home, Campbelltown Stadium, which proved to be the bogey ground for the Central Coast outfit as they failed to gain a single competition point from the venue. However, in round 7, the Mariners responded with a 6–0 drubbing of Adelaide United, in Adelaide. That result would become the biggest team score and also the biggest win in the inaugural season by any team. Unable to maintain the momentum, the Mariners again lost another two back-to-back fixtures without scoring a goal and other results didn't go their way leading into the final round which meant a win against Melbourne Victory would not be enough to finish in the top 4 for the finals. The Mariners did win their final match for the regular season, almost ending Melbourne's finals hopes. The match was played in torrential rain, however, the Parramatta pitch held up as the Mariners put two late goals past the Victory shot stopper to win the match 2–0. With the Mariners in fifth at the conclusion of the round 10 fixture, only a win by Sydney FC would put the Mariners into sixth and Melbourne into fifth. In a thrilling match, Sydney were up 3–0 within 28 minutes, but Adelaide United were not to be out done, with a thrilling finish that saw Adelaide score two mid-second-half goals, but could push for a third. Sydney defeated Adelaide 3–2 and attained the remaining finals spot. That result confirming the Mariners' 6th position on the ladder, divided only by goal difference with the fifth placed Melbourne.

Kyah Simon, the leading goal scorer for the Mariners with 5, was only 2 goals short of the golden boot award which went eventually to Sydney's Leena Khamis. In a season that featured 4 wins and 6 losses from the 10 fixtures, the Mariners would be looking to improve on that for the next season.

2009 season

After not making the finals in the inaugural season, many changes were to follow. Eleven players from season 1 did not have their contract re-newed with the Mariners. As a result, there were ten new signings for the new season. Five of which from Sydney FC Rachel Cooper; Jessica Seaman; Samantha Spackman; Kelly Golebiowski; Michelle Heyman, and three from the USA Jillian Loyden; Kendall Fletcher; Lydia Vandenbergh, with Caitlin Foord and Ashleigh Connor from the AIS and Illawarra Stingrays respectively.

But the changes were to continue as the Mariners' would now play their home matches at the real home (men's senior and youth teams) of the Central Coast Mariners, then named Bluetongue Stadium. Other home matches were played at Canberra Stadium against Canberra (as a double-header with a Men's A-League fixture), and at Leichhardt Oval in Sydney as part of a W-League double-header.

The new season started in the best possible fashion for the Mariners with a 3–1 victory over traditional rivals Sydney FC away at the Sydney Football Stadium. The derby fueled by the fact that all three goals from the Mariners were scored from former Sydney players – Kelly Golebiowski and a double by Michelle Heyman. The Mariners continued their winning streak to a club record of 3 consecutive wins with a 2–0 victory over Adelaide at the Mariners first home game at Bluetongue Stadium in wet conditions. In a match dominated by the yellow and navy, goals were hard to come by, however the final 17 minutes produced the match winning goals from Trudy Camilleri and Ashleigh Connor, with the latter being a driven low shot from the edge of the 6-yard box. The inaugural champions (Brisbane Roar) were the next opponents in a top of the table clash. In a tight affair the Roar dominated the possession and the shots at goal. Late in the second-half, the Roar scored the one and only goal of the match. With a loss to the Roar, the Mariners were looking to get back on the score sheet and into the winners circle and that's just what they did against the near rivals Newcastle. The derby produced 6 goals with the Mariners 5–1 runaway winners. Lydia Vandenburgh scored with only 5 minutes gone. Michelle Heyman added another two and on the half-hour mark it was 3–0. A second-half penalty to Kendall Fletcher and a late goal from substitute Trudy Camilleri completed the Mariners scoring, but an 89th minute consolation goal to the Jets rounded off the scoring.

Hiatus
Due to lack of funding the Central Coast Mariners were forced to pull out of the 2010–11 W-League season.

Colours and badge
The club colours are yellow and navy blue. The club badge depicts a yellow football at the centre of a wave.

Stadium
The club played home games at a number of locations, including Bluetongue Stadium (home of the Central Coast Mariners) as well as Parramatta Stadium, Campbelltown Stadium, Leichhardt Oval and Canberra Stadium.

Players

First-team squad

Honours
W-League Premiership:
Runners-up: 2009

Records
League victory:
6–0 v Adelaide United, 6 December 2008
6–0 v Adelaide United, 14 November 2009
Top scorer:
 Michelle Heyman (11)
Most appearances:
 Rachael Doyle (21)
 Renee Rollason (21)

Head to head record

See also

Central Coast Mariners FC
W-League
Central Coast Mariners FC W-League players

References

External links
Central Coast Mariners official website
Football Federation Australia official website

Central Coast Mariners FC (A-League Women)
Central Coast Mariners FC
A-League Women teams
Women's soccer clubs in Australia
2008 establishments in Australia

Central Coast Mariners